Allan Moore (born 25 December 1964) is a Scottish football player and manager.

Playing career
During his playing career he turned out for several Scottish clubs including Dumbarton, Heart of Midlothian, St Johnstone, Partick Thistle and Morton.

Management career
Moore was appointed manager of Stirling Albion in 2002, succeeding Ray Stewart. At this time, the club was languishing at second bottom of the Third Division. Moore's impact was recognised instantly, and in the 2003–04 season he successfully guided Stirling to promotion to the Second Division. Steady progress in the next few years culminated in yet another promotion, via the playoffs, to the First Division at the end of the 2006–07 season. However, this proved too much for Stirling, as the club were relegated back into the Second Division after just one season.

In October 2009, Moore expressed a strong interest in taking the vacant managers position at former club Greenock Morton, citing the move as an opportunity to work at a full-time club. Moore then confirmed that he had been given permission to speak to Morton. However, after Morton approached Albion over the release of Moore, the compensation package of £160k – £180k was too much for Morton chairman Douglas Rae, and the deal was called off.

Moore was appointed manager of Greenock Morton on 26 May 2010. He won the First Division Manager of the Month for August 2011, and won it again in October 2012 and December 2012. Moore was sacked after a 5–1 home defeat to Livingston on 23 November 2013.

Moore was appointed manager of Arbroath in June 2014. He was sacked in April 2015 following poor form. 

In November 2017, Moore was handed the role of assistant manager to Danny Lennon at Scottish League Two club Clyde.
In October 2022, the club announced that Moore will take over on an interim basis, following Lennon’s departure.  This spell ended when Jim Duffy was appointed manager on 7 November.

Business interests
According to an interview with team-mate Paul Cherry in the "J-Files" fanzine, issue 1 of November 1998, Moore operated a burger van during a house-building boom seen in Perth from the late 1980s as his St Johnstone career peaked. The enterprise declined in interest once builders moved on to other sites.

Honours

Player

Dumbarton
Scottish First Division promotion 1983–84

St.Johnstone
Scottish First Division 1989–90

Dunfermline
Scottish First Division 1995–96

Manager

Stirling Albion
Scottish Football League Third Division promotion (1): 2003–04
Stirlingshire Cup (3) : 2003–04, 2004–05, 2005–06
Scottish Football League First Division play-off winners (1): 2006–07
Scottish Football League Second Division champions (1): 2009–10

Greenock Morton
Renfrewshire Cup (1): 2012–13

Assistant Manager

Clyde

Scottish League One play-offs (1): 2018-19
 North Lanarkshire Cup (2): 2020-21, 2021-22

Personal
First Division Manager of the Month (3): August 2011, October 2012, December 2012
Second Division Manager of the Month (6): December 2005, November 2006, March 2007, January 2009, September 2009, April 2010

Managerial statistics

References

External links

Profile at londonhearts.com

1964 births
Airdrieonians F.C. (1878) players
Association football wingers
Clyde F.C. non-playing staff
Dumbarton F.C. players
Dunfermline Athletic F.C. players
Greenock Morton F.C. managers
Greenock Morton F.C. non-playing staff
Greenock Morton F.C. players
Heart of Midlothian F.C. players
Living people
Livingston F.C. players
Queen of the South F.C. players
Partick Thistle F.C. players
Scottish Professional Football League managers
Scottish Football League managers
Scottish Football League players
Scottish football managers
Scottish footballers
Footballers from Glasgow
St Johnstone F.C. players
Stirling Albion F.C. managers
Stirling Albion F.C. players